The 1996–97 Serie A season was the 63rd season of the Serie A, the top level of ice hockey in Italy. 16 teams participated in the league, and HC Bozen won the championship by defeating HC Milan 24 in the final. HC Bozen and HC Milan 24 qualified directly for the final round, because they were playing in the Alpenliga during the regular season.

First round

Second round

Group A

Group B

Final round

Playoffs

External links
 Season on hockeyarchives.info

1996–97 in Italian ice hockey
Serie A (ice hockey) seasons
Italy